Athletes from the Netherlands competed at the 2006 Winter Olympics in Turin, Italy. The team of 35 competed in speed skating, bobsleigh, short track speed skating and snowboarding. The Dutch flag bearer during the opening ceremony was speedskater Jan Bos.

Historically, the Dutch have only won medals in skating; of their 78 Winter Olympic medals since 1952, 75 have been won in speed skating, and a further three in figure skating. The Netherlands have not won a figure skating medal since 1976.

Dirk Matschenz (skeleton) did meet the limits set by the Dutch Olympic Committee but did not participate because he did not get his Dutch passport before the start of the Olympics. Matschenz is originally from Germany.

Medalists

Bobsleigh

Short track speed skating

Snowboarding 

Two women were selected for the Netherlands in snowboarding events in Torino; Cheryl Maas for the halfpipe event and Nicolien Sauerbreij in the parallel giant slalom event. Maas qualified in 4th place for the final, but on her final run, Maas landed on the top edge of the halfpipe, fell and ended up in 11th.

Halfpipe

Note: In the final, the single best score from two runs is used to determine the ranking. A bracketed score indicates a run that wasn't counted.

Parallel GS

Key: '+ Time' represents a deficit; the brackets indicate the results of each run.

Speed skating 

Men

Women

Team Pursuit

References

Further references
  Gekwalificeerde sporters Olympische Spelen 2006, from the Dutch Olympic Committee, retrieved 23 January 2006

Nations at the 2006 Winter Olympics
2006
Winter Olympics